Parastoo Salehi (born October 31, 1977 in Tehran) is an Iranian actress, make-up trainer, and social activist. She gained her fame from playing in Under the City Sky.

Salehi is a make-up graduate with late maestro "Farhang Moayeri," besides acting, she also instructs make-up for her trainees.

She has a background performing for the greatest Iranian directors, such as Asghar Farhadi, Bahman Farmanara, and Massoud Kimai.

Filmography 
Salehi had her first role onstage in 1997 and Inn Zaminiha was her first Television performance.

Film 
 The Moment of a Divorce
 Takhte-Gaaz
 Maslakh
 Namira
 Yek Nafar Ta Marg
 Irreversible
 ZigZag
 Love Again
 Manhunter
 A House in the Dust
 Agha
 Reflection
 Ham-Class
 A House Built on Water
 Eteraaz
 I Love You
 Chesmhayash

Television

References

External links 

 
 Parastoo Salehi at Sourehcinema
 

1977 births
Living people
People from Tehran
Actresses from Tehran
Iranian film actresses
Iranian make-up artists
Iranian television actresses